Carnarvon is a small town in the Northern Cape Province of South Africa.

History 

Carnarvon was established in 1853 on a route between Cape Town and Botswana that was followed by early explorers and traders. It was originally established as a mission station of the Rhenish Missionary Society and named Harmsfontein. The Rhenish missionaries also established Schietfontein to the west, which later developed into a village. In 1874 Harmsfontein was renamed Carnarvon in honour of the British Colonial Secretary, Lord Carnarvon (1831–1890).

The town is known for its corbelled houses - domed-roof houses constructed from flat stones - which were built between 1811 and 1815.

The Afrikaans poet A.G. Visser had strong associations with Carnarvon, and the house where he lived in the town still stands.

Carnarvon Museum contains exhibits on the region's cultural history. The building was constructed in 1907, and was originally the community hall for the Dutch Reformed Church before being donated to the municipality when a new community centre was constructed in 1973. The museum holds a number of antiques related to the area, including an old hearse previously used by the Dutch Reformed Church. A corbelled house is preserved outside the museum, which was relocated from a nearby farm.

An English-built fort was constructed on top of the hill that overlooks Carnarvon during the Second Boer War. The hill, now named Koeëlkop (after the Afrikaans word for bullet, koeël), is now used for a water reservoir; the remains of the fort were later rebuilt.

Population

Economy 
Carnarvon is a busy farming centre. Its main agricultural activity is [dorper] sheep farming.

The town centre has a Spar store.

Square Kilometre Array 
The MeerKAT radio telescope array is under construction at a site around 90 km from Carnarvon. The core of the Square Kilometre Array will also be constructed on the same site.

Activities 
 Carnarvon Nature Reserve is home to 11 species of game.
 Carnarvon also has a private tortoise reserve, containing 60 leopard tortoises.

Transport 
There are three tarred roads out of Carnarvon. The road west to the picturesque Williston and Calvinia and the road south and then east to Victoria West are numbered as part of the R63 provincial route, while the road east to Britstown is numbered as the R384 regional route.

Carnarvon Airport accommodates light and ultra-light aircraft.

Carnarvon was also served by a station on the branch railway line from Hutchinson to Calvinia, which was closed in 2001.

Education 
The modern public library meets the needs of all readers and the local high school is capable of preparing pupils to virtually follow any career path.  With a hostel, the school offers accommodation to pupils whose families do not live close to town.

Religion 
In 1875, the NG Church was established and the first pastor was Rev. WP de Villiers, pastor of NG Beaufort West.  For 30 Years Rev. de Villiers was head of the NG Church.  As there were no schools, the pastor, when his duties allowed, and his wife started a teaching school. The first church was built using stone.  At a total cost of £12,000  the first church was inaugurated in February 1882.  But the cornerstone reads: "Deze steen werd gelegd in de naam van die Vader, Zoon en Heilige Geest. 23 September 1880.", stating 23 September 1880 as the inaugurated date. The adult professing NG Church membership was 830 in 1979, 660 in 1999, 468 in 2000, 406 in 2007 and 375 in 2012.

References

External links

History of Carnarvon
Carnarvon

Populated places in the Kareeberg Local Municipality
Karoo
Populated places established in 1853